Alexander Nedeljkovic (born January 7, 1996) is an American professional ice hockey goaltender for the Grand Rapids Griffins of the American Hockey League (AHL) while under contract to the Detroit Red Wings of the National Hockey League (NHL). Nedeljkovic was selected by the Carolina Hurricanes in the second round (37th overall) of the 2014 NHL Entry Draft.

Playing career

Junior
Nedeljkovic grew up in Cleveland, where he played for the Cleveland Barons bantam AAA team, and played with them in the 2009 Quebec International Pee-Wee Hockey Tournament.

He started his major junior play in 2012 in the Ontario Hockey League with the Plymouth Whalers, where in his rookie season he posted a goals against average of 2.28 to win the F. W. "Dinty" Moore Trophy, and was also named to the 2012–13 OHL First All-Rookie Team. The following season, Nedeljkovic won a silver medal with Team USA at the 2013 Ivan Hlinka Memorial Tournament, and was selected to play in both the CCM/USA Hockey All-American Prospects Game and the 2014 CHL/NHL Top Prospects Game.

Professional

Carolina Hurricanes
At the conclusion of the 2014–15 season with the Whalers, Nedeljkovic signed a three-year, entry-level contract with the Carolina Hurricanes on March 27, 2015. He was assigned to the ECHL affiliate, the Florida Everblades, to make his professional debut in the final regular season games.

During his final season of junior in the 2015–16 campaign, Nedeljkovic was traded by the Flint Firebirds, along with fellow Hurricanes draft pick Josh Wesley, to the Niagara IceDogs in exchange for goaltender Brent Moran in November 2015.

In his rookie professional season in 2016–17, on December 30, 2016, Nedeljkovic, while playing for the Florida Everblades, became the 12th ECHL goaltender to score a goal. On January 17, 2017, Nedeljkovic played his first NHL game, in relief of starter Cam Ward against the Columbus Blue Jackets at Nationwide Arena.

During the 2017–18 season, on March 10, 2018, while playing for the Charlotte Checkers in a game against the Hartford Wolf Pack, Nedeljkovic became the 13th goaltender in AHL history to score a goal.

After starting the 2018–19 season with the Checkers, Nedeljkovic was recalled to the NHL on January 17, 2019. On January 23, 2019, against the Vancouver Canucks, he made his first NHL start. He made 24 saves on 26 shots to secure his first win in the NHL.

On June 28, 2019, Nedeljkovic signed a two-year contract extension with the Hurricanes.

In the pandemic delayed  season, Nedeljkovic remained with the Hurricanes due to the expanded roster, and responded with a break-out season in the NHL. On February 20, 2021, in a 4–0 victory over the Tampa Bay Lightning, Nedeljkovic recorded his first career NHL shutout. On April 1, 2021, Nedeljkovic was named NHL's Rookie of the Month for games played in March. In 23 regular season games, he posted a 15–5–3 record for the division-leading Carolina and tied for the NHL rookie lead in shutouts alongside Ilya Sorokin with three. Nedeljkovic recorded a 1.90 goals-against average and .932 save percentage to led all NHL goalies who played at least 20 games.

On May 17, 2021, Nedeljkovic reported his first Stanley Cup playoff win with a 5–2 win over the Nashville Predators. On May 19, 2021, Nedeljkovic reported his first Stanley Cup playoff shutout with a 3–0 victory over the Predators. He collected four wins in nine post-season games, unable to help propel the Hurricanes past the second-round. On June, 2021, Nedeljkovic was a finalist for the Calder Trophy, given to the NHL's rookie of the year, placing third behind Kirill Kaprizov and Jason Robertson and was named in the NHL All-Rookie Team.

Detroit Red Wings
As a restricted free agent, unable to agree to terms on a new contract with the Hurricanes, Nedeljkovic was traded to the Detroit Red Wings in exchange for Jonathan Bernier and a third-round pick in 2021 on July 22, 2021. Nedeljkovic was immediately signed to a two-year, $6 million contract by the Red Wings.

He would record his first shutout as a member of the Red Wings on January 15, 2022, over the Buffalo Sabres with several family members in attendance at Little Caesars Arena. After a strong fall start to his first season with the Red Wings, Nedeljkovic struggled in the New Year, having gone 2–5–1, with a 4.64 goals against average and .849 save percentage in his previous nine appearances by the beginning of March. He made headlines on March 10, 2022, when he accidentally scored an own goal by sweeping into the net a puck that had been traveling wide of it, dubbed a "gaffe for the ages" by the Detroit Free Press.

Personal life
Nedeljkovic is of Serbian descent. His grandparents are from a village near the town of Ljubovija, Serbia. Currently, the back plate of his mask has a Serbian cross, an homage to both his Serbian descent and likely Orthodox faith.

Career statistics

Regular season and playoffs

International

Awards and honors

References

External links 
 

1996 births
American men's ice hockey goaltenders
American people of Serbian descent
Carolina Hurricanes draft picks
Carolina Hurricanes players
Charlotte Checkers (2010–) players
Detroit Red Wings players
Flint Firebirds players
Florida Everblades players
Grand Rapids Griffins players
Ice hockey players from Ohio
Living people
Niagara IceDogs players
People from Parma, Ohio
Plymouth Whalers players